"Casey Jones—the Union Scab" is a song, written by labor figure Joe Hill in San Pedro, California, shortly after the first day of a nationwide walkout of 40,000 railway employees in the Illinois Central shopmen's strike of 1911. It is a parody of the song 
"The Ballad of Casey Jones" and is sung to its tune.

The song was published in the Little Red Songbook in 1912. 
The song was included in a 2006 album of American folk songs "Classic Labor Songs from Smithsonian Folkways" released by the Smithsonian Institution.

Recordings of Joe Hill’s lyrics exist by Utah Phillips, and by Pete Seeger; translations into foreign language include those in Russian, by Leonid Utyosov, and in Hungarian, by the Szirt Együttes.

See also

 Wobbly lingo
 List of train songs

References

Trade union songs
1911 songs
Songs with lyrics by Joe Hill (activist)
Musical parodies
American folk songs
Train wreck ballads
Songs based on actual events
Songs about trains
Songs about Casey Jones